Yuliya Plamenova Stoyanova (born 22 July 1985) is a Bulgarian female volleyball player, playing as an outside-spiker. She is part of the Bulgaria women's national volleyball team. She competed at the 2015 Women's European Volleyball Championship, 2015 FIVB World Grand Prix, and 2017 FIVB World Grand Prix.

On the University level she played for University of Tennessee.

Clubs 
  Istres Ouest Provence Volley-Ball 2014-2015
  Vandoeuvre Nancy 2016 - 2017

References

External links 
 http://www.lnv.fr/joueurs/1967/yuliya-stoyanova.html
 http://www.cev.lu/Competition-Area/PlayerDetails.aspx?TeamID=8785&PlayerID=28356&ID=739

1985 births
Living people
Bulgarian women's volleyball players
Place of birth missing (living people)
Tennessee Volunteers women's volleyball players
Opposite hitters
Expatriate volleyball players in France
Expatriate volleyball players in the United States
Outside hitters
Bulgarian expatriate sportspeople in France
Bulgarian expatriate sportspeople in the United States